Unity was a Russian political party that was created in September 1999 and registered on 15 October 1999, supported by Russia’s President Boris Yeltsin, Prime Minister Vladimir Putin and dozens of Russian governors to counter the threat which the Kremlin perceived from the Fatherland-All Russia alliance. It was also unofficially dubbed "Medved’" (the bear) or "Medvedi" (bears), as "MeDvEd" was an acronym of its full name (Mezhregionalnoye Dvizheniye "Edinstvo"; Interregional movement "Unity"). Later the party adopted a brown bear for its symbol.

History

The rise of Unity was meteoric given the short time period it had to create an identity, plan its campaign strategy and carry out its ambitious objectives. The establishment of the movement followed a declaration signed by 39 governors expressing their dissatisfaction with the political battles being fought in Russia. The initial meeting of these governors to form a new electoral movement was held on 24 September 1999. It was at this meeting that Minister of Emergency Situations Sergey Shoygu was selected as Unity’s leader.

Prime Minister Putin immediately pledged support for the new bloc, saying it could help stabilize the political situation in Russia. On November 24, 1999 he told reporters that in his capacity as premier, he "should not define his political preferences" with respect to election blocs but "as an ordinary citizen" he will vote for Unity. The party’s leading candidates in 1999 State Duma elections were Sergey Shoygu, nine-times world wrestling champion Alexander Karelin and former senior police official Alexander Gurov. Unity, backed up by popular support for the Second Chechen War, relied on a campaign of verbal attacks to discredit the Fatherland-All Russia alliance. It was also heavily promoted by the ORT TV channel and especially "Sergey Dorenko's Program".

In the 1999, State Duma elections on December 19, Unity received 23.32 percent of the vote and won 72 of 441 seats (second result after the Communist Party of the Russian Federation). Later ten more seats joined the faction. Shoygu remained Emergencies Minister and did not go into the new State Duma. On January 12, 2000 the party elected Boris Gryzlov leader of its faction.

The party supported Vladimir Putin in the 2000 presidential elections.

In April 2001, the Unity party and the Fatherland - All Russia movement took the decision to unite into a single political party, United Russia.

Electoral results

Presidential

State Duma

See also
 United Russia

References

External links
Sudden rise of the Unity party, BBC News, 20.12.1999
Interregional political movement "Unity"("Edinstvo"). An analysis of recent trends in Russian politics
Political groups and parties: Unity
Results of previous Duma elections
Yedinstvo (Medved’) (In Russian)

Defunct political parties in Russia
Political parties established in 1999
United Russia
1999 establishments in Russia
History of Russia (1991–present)
2001 disestablishments in Russia
Political parties disestablished in 2001
National conservative parties